The Syrian Arab News Agency (SANA) is a Syrian state-controlled news agency, linked to the country's ministry of information. It was established in June 1965.

Website
SANA launched its website in 1997. Up until November 2012, SANA's website was hosted in Dallas, Texas, by the United States company SoftLayer. Due to sanctions related to the Syrian Civil War, which make this hosting illegal, the SoftLayer company was obliged to terminate its hosting responsibilities with SANA.

SANA's English website states that the agency "adopts Syria's national firm stances and its support to the Arab and Islamic causes and principles with the aim of presenting the real civilized image of Syria."

Criticism
According to German news agency Deutsche Welle; “when it comes to hard politics, the agency [SANA] has a clear agenda" and "SANA, being a public news agency, has a stake in the conflict to support Assad's government." The agency does not describe opposition groups as "rebels", but rather labels them "terrorists".

In 2011, SANA published an article giving its version of events surrounding the death of 13-year-old Hamza Ali Al-Khateeb, an account which differed from Al Jazeera's. Al Jazeera reported that Hamza "spent nearly a month in the custody of Syrian security" and when his corpse was returned it "bore the scars of brutal torture." According to Al Jazeera, "experienced local journalists and human rights researchers found no reason to doubt the authenticity of the footage of Hamza." According to SANA, armed groups arrived in the village of Saida and Hamza was found dead after the fighting and sent to a hospital to be identified. SANA, quoting a coroner, stated that Hamza died from three gunshots and that "there weren't any traces of violence, resistance or torture or any kinds of bruises, fractures, joint displacements or cuts." According to SANA, the photos of Hamza circulating online "were taken after an advanced stage of disintegration after death."

SANA called reports from August 2013 on a chemical attack in Ghouta "baseless" and an attempt to distract UN inspectors who had arrived in Syria to probe earlier allegations of chemical weapons use. SANA had reported that anti-government forces were responsible for firing a rocket containing chemical materials in the Khan-al Assal area of Aleppo province in March 2013.

In August 2015, after a three-day visit to Syria during the Syrian civil war, the  emergency relief coordinator of the United Nations, Stephen O'Brien, told reporters he was "absolutely horrified by the total disregard for civilian life by all parties in this conflict." O'Brien condemned the conduct of rebel groups and said (of the government airstrikes in Douma) "[they]…caused scores of civilian deaths and hundreds of people were injured." SANA posted a video of his remarks on YouTube, editing the footage as a form of backlash, fading it to black before playing audio of his description of the government's attack. SANA also omitted O'Brien's account of events from his time in the Old City of Homs.

Managers
Fawaz Jundi (1965–1966)
Hussein al-Awdat (1966–1971)
Marwan al-Hamwi (1971–1975)
Saber Falhout (1975–1991)
Fayez al-Sayegh (1991–2000)
Ali Abdul Karim (2000–2002)
Ghazi al-Zeeb (2002–2004)
Dr. Adnan Mahmoud (2004–2011)
Ahmad Dawa (2011–2017)
Abderrahim Ahmed (2017–2021)
Iyad Wannous (2021–present)

See also
 Federation of Arab News Agencies (FANA)

References

External links
Syrian Arab News Agency Official Website (in English)

1965 establishments in Syria
News agencies based in Syria
Government of Syria
Arab news agencies
Government agencies established in 1965
Mass media in Damascus